Choi Kwang-hyouk (born 15 March 1987) is a South Korean ice sledge hockey player. He was a member of South Korea's  bronze medal winning team in para ice hockey at the 2018 Winter Paralympics.

Choi was born in North Korea, where his left leg was crushed in a train accident, and doctors amputated it below the knee. Choi then defected in 2001, fleeing through China with the help of his uncle.

References

External links 
 

1987 births
Living people
South Korean sledge hockey players
Paralympic bronze medalists for South Korea
Paralympic sledge hockey players of South Korea
Para ice hockey players at the 2018 Winter Paralympics
Para ice hockey players at the 2022 Winter Paralympics
Medalists at the 2018 Winter Paralympics
South Korean people of North Korean origin
North Korean defectors
Paralympic medalists in sledge hockey
21st-century South Korean people